Swim Kids is an Australian initiative by Uncle Tobys together with Royal Life Saving Society Australia. The goal is to reach the long term objective of helping thousands of Australian kids learn how to swim and survive.

The website features swimming videos from Grant Hackett and Eamon Sullivan, and tips from Emily Seebohm and Cate Campbell.

See also 
Swimming lessons

References

External links 
 Swim Kids Official Website
 Uncle Tobys
 Royal Life Saving Society of Australia

Swimming in Australia
Organizations established in 2010
2010 establishments in Australia